These are the 1969 Five Nations Championship squads:

England

 Timothy Dalton
 David Duckham
 Keith Fairbrother
 Keith Fielding
 John Finlan
 Dick Greenwood (c.)
 Bob Hiller
 Nigel Horton
 Peter Larter
 Ken Plummer
 Piggy Powell
 John Pullin
 Budge Rogers
 Dave Rollitt
 John Spencer
 Bob Taylor
 Rod Webb
 Trevor Wintle

France

Head coach: Fernand Cazenave

 Jean-Louis Azarete
 René Benesis
 Jean-Louis Berot
 Pierre Biemouret
 Jean-Marie Bonal
 André Campaes
 Christian Carrère (c.)
 Elie Cester
 Benoît Dauga
 Claude Dourthe
 Jean-Michel Esponda
 Jean Gachassin
 Michel Hauser
 Jean Iracabal
 Claude Lacaze
 Michel Lasserre
 Jean-Pierre Lux
 Jo Maso
 Basile Moraitis
 Alain Plantefol
 Marcel Puget (c.)*
 Jean Salut
 Gérard Sutra
 Christian Swierczinski
 Walter Spanghero (c.)**
 Jean Trillo
 Gérard Viard
 Michel Yachvili
 Pierre Villepreux

 captain in the third game
 captain in the fourth game

Ireland

Head coach: Ronnie Dawson

 Barry Bresnihan
 James Davidson
 Alan Duggan
 Mike Gibson
 Ken Goodall
 Colin Grimshaw
 Mike Hipwell
 Ken Kennedy
 Tom Kiernan (c.)
 Willie John McBride
 Barry McGann
 Syd Millar
 Mick Molloy
 John Moroney
 Noel Murphy
 Philo O'Callaghan
 Harry Rea
 Roger Young

Scotland

 Dick Allan
 Rodger Arneil
 Colin Blaikie
 Peter Brown
 Sandy Carmichael
 Gordon Connell
 Tommy Elliot
 John Frame
 Sandy Hinshelwood
 Doug Jackson
 Frank Laidlaw
 Wilson Lauder
 Gordon Macdonald
 Ian McCrae
 Alastair McHarg
 Ian McLauchlan
 Chris Rea
 Ian Robertson
 Peter Stagg
 Billy Steele
 Norm Suddon
 Colin Telfer
 Jim Telfer (c.)
 Jock Turner

Wales

Head coach: Clive Rowlands

 Phil Bennett
 Gerald Davies
 Mervyn Davies
 John Dawes
 Gareth Edwards (c.)*
 Keith Jarrett
 Barry John
 John Lloyd
 Dai Morris
 Brian Price (c.)
 Maurice Richards
 John Taylor
 Brian Thomas
 Delme Thomas
 Stuart Watkins
 Denzil Williams
 J.P.R. Williams
 Jeff Young

 captain in the last game

External links
1969 Five Nations Championship at ESPN

Six Nations Championship squads